The Summit of the Gods is a 2021 French-language animated film based on the Japanese manga series of the same name by Jiro Taniguchi. The film was directed by Patrick Imbert; it was first shown at the 2021 Cannes Film Festival in July 2021 before a full theatrical release in September 2021.

Plot 
In 1924, George Mallory and Andrew Irvine attempted to climb Mount Everest and were never seen again. Seventy years later, Makoto Fukamachi, a young Japanese reporter, encounters a mysterious mountain climber named Habu Joji, in whose hands Fukamachi thinks he sees Mallory's camera, which might reveal if Mallory and his companion really were the first to climb Everest.

Fukamachi tries to find more information on Habu as he revisits his past and the people involved in his life. Gradually as he becomes more involved with Habu, to the extent that he ultimately finds himself joining him on Everest to record Habu's own attempt to reach the peak. After braving the harsh conditions and worsening health conditions, Fukamachi returns to the base without Habu, who carries on with his journey. As Habu summits the peak, it is shown that Fukamachi waits for him for days at the base but he never returns. After days of waiting and still no sign of Habu, he returns from the base but not before Habu's companion gives him Mallory's camera that he had been looking for.

In the end, Fukamachi develops the camera film and ultimately understands why Habu or any other mountaineer keeps going back to the mountains. The last scene shows him summiting one of the peaks, just like Habu.

Production
The film is based on a manga series of the same name, written and illustrated by Jiro Taniguchi, which was itself based on a 1998 novel by Baku Yumemakura. In January 2015, a French-language CG animation film adaptation of the manga was announced. It was originally set to be produced by Julianne Films, Walking The Dog, and Mélusine Productions, with direction from Éric Valli and Jean-Christophe Roger. In June 2020, it was announced the film would instead be directed by Patrick Imbert, with scripts by Imbert, Magali Pouzol, and Jean-Charles Ostorero, and music composed by Amine Bouhafa. It was also announced the film would be distributed by Diaphana Distribution in France and Wild Bunch internationally. The film was first shown at the 2021 Cannes Film Festival on July 15, 2021, before a full theatrical release in France starting on September 22, 2021.

Internationally, Netflix released the film in theaters in the United States starting on November 24, 2021, and in the United Kingdom on November 26, 2021. The film was made available for streaming on November 30, 2021.

Reception
Carlos Aguilar from TheWrap praised the film for its plot and animation. Michael Nordine from Variety also praised the plot and animation, specifically for being realistic. Benjamin Benoit from IGN also gave the film praise for being a great adaptation of the original source material.

Accolades

References

External links
 

Animated films based on manga
French animated films
Luxembourgian animated films
Wild Bunch (company) films
Animated films set in Nepal
2021 animated films
2021 drama films
2020s French films
Films about Mount Everest

ja:神々の山嶺#アニメ